Wheelchair basketball is basketball played by people with varying physical disabilities that disqualify them from playing a non-disabled sport. These include birth defects, cerebral palsy, paralysis due to accident, amputations (of the legs, or other parts), and many other disabilities. The International Wheelchair Basketball Federation (IWBF) is the governing body for this sport. It is recognized by the International Paralympic Committee (IPC) as the sole competent authority in wheelchair basketball worldwide. FIBA has recognized IWBF under Article 53 of its General Statutes.

The IWBF has 95 National Organizations for Wheelchair Basketball (NOWBs) participating in wheelchair basketball throughout the world, with this number increasing each year. It is estimated that more than 100,000 people play wheelchair basketball from recreation to club play and as elite national team members.

Wheelchair basketball is included in the Paralympic Games. The Wheelchair Basketball World Championship is played two years after every Paralympic Games. Major competition in wheelchair basketball comes from Canada, Australia, the United States, Great Britain, the Netherlands, and Japan.

History

1940s to 1960s
In 1944, Ludwig Guttmann, through the rehabilitation program at the Stoke Mandeville Hospital, in Aylesbury, Buckinghamshire, England, adapted existing sports to use wheelchairs. It was known as wheelchair netball.

At around the same times, starting from 1946, wheelchair basketball games were played primarily between American World War II disabled veterans. It was used as a way for these soldiers to rehabilitate and socialize with other disabled veterans. Wheelchair basketball helped the veterans become more physically active and improve in skills such as coordination and communication. This began in the United States at the University of Illinois. Dr. Timothy Nugent founded the National Wheelchair Basketball Association in 1949 and served as commissioner for the first 25 years.

The Stoke Mandeville Wheelchair Games, held in 1947, were the first games to be held and included only a handful of participants (26), and few events (shot put, javelin, club throw, and archery).

The number of wheelchair events and participants grew quickly. Wheelchair netball was introduced in the 1948 Games. In 1952, a team from the Netherlands was invited to compete with the British team. This became the first International Stoke-Mandeville Games (ISMG), an event that has been held annually ever since.

Wheelchair basketball, as we know it now, was first played at the 1956 International Stoke-Mandeville Games. The US "Pan Am Jets" team won the tournament.

1970s to present

In 1973, the International Stoke Mandeville Games Federation (ISMGF) established the first sub-section for wheelchair basketball. At that time, ISMGF was the world governing body for all wheelchair sports.

In 1989, ISMGF accepted for its former wheelchair basketball sub-section to be named International Wheelchair Basketball Federation (IWBF).

Full independence came in 1993 with the IWBF becoming the world body for wheelchair basketball with full responsibility for development of the sport. Over the following years, IWBF membership grew in size, and based on the number of National Organizations for Wheelchair Basketball (NOWBs) with active programs, the international federation configured itself into four geographical zones: Africa, Americas, Asia/Oceania and Europe.

Wheelchair Basketball World Championship

World championships for the sport have been held since 1973, with Bruges, Belgium being the first host city. The first world championship for men was won by Great Britain. Of the first 11 men's world championships, six were won by the United States (1979, 1983, 1986, 1994, 1998, 2002), two were won by Great Britain (1973, 2018), two were won by Australia (2010, 2014); and once each by Israel (1975), France (1990) and  Canada (2006). Canada has won five  of the women's world championship titles (1994, 1998, 2002, 2006, 2014), the United States two (1990, 2010) and the Netherlands one (2018).

Rules

Wheelchair basketball retains most major rules and scoring of basketball, and maintains a 10-foot basketball hoop and standard basketball court. The exceptions are rules which have been modified with consideration for the wheelchair. For example, "travelling" in wheelchair basketball occurs when the athlete touches their wheels more than twice after receiving or dribbling the ball. The individual must pass, bounce, or shoot the ball before touching the wheels again.

In some countries, such as Canada, Australia, and England, non-disabled athletes using wheelchairs are allowed to compete alongside other athletes on mixed teams.

Classifications

Classification is an international regulation for playing wheelchair basketball to harmonize players' different levels of disabilities. All teams which compete above a recreational level use the classification system to evaluate the functional abilities of players on a point scale of 1 to 4.5. Minimally disabled athletes are classified as a 4.5, and an individual with the highest degree of disability (such as a paraplegic with a complete injury below the chest) would be classified as a 1.0. Competitions restrict the number of points allowable on the court at one time. The five players from each team on the court during play may not exceed a total of 14 points. In places where teams are integrated, non-disabled athletes compete as either a 4.5 in Canada or a 5.0 in Europe; however, non-disabled athletes are not allowed to compete internationally.

Wheelchair design
Basketball wheelchairs are designed for enhanced stability. The center of gravity is where the chair and the athlete's mass are equally distributed in all directions. Points at which the wheelchair can tip over sideways are the fulcrum. A wheelchair with a higher seat is easier to tip. Basketball chairs have lower seats and wheels that are angled outward so that the center of gravity has to move a greater distance before it passes over the fulcrum and tips the chair. Guards use wheelchairs different from those of centers and forwards. Forwards and centers are typically under the net, so their chairs have higher seats and therefore less stability, but the height increases the player's reach for shots at the hoop and for rebounds. Guards have lower seats and therefore greater stability for ball handling and getting down the court as quickly as possible.

Wheelchair 3on3
Was started since 2019.

See also
 Wheelchair basketball at the Summer Paralympics
 Basketball ID at the 2000 Summer Paralympics
 European Wheelchair Basketball Championship
 Africa Wheelchair Basketball Championship
 Real (manga)

References

Jerusalem Post article about wheelchair basketball: "Hoop Dreams"
Learn about Wheelchair Basketball and Find Activities
"The 50th Anniversary of Wheelchair Basketball, A History," by Horst Strohkendl, Waxman Publishing Co, NY, 1996
World History of Wheelchair Basketball, British Wheelchair Basketball
 History, National Wheelchair Basketball Association

External links

 University of Illinois wheelchair basketball
International Wheelchair Basketball Federation
Wheelchair basketball on the International Paralympic Committee website
Invacare top end basketball wheelchairs used by Paralympic athletes 

 
Team sports
Forms of basketball
Articles containing video clips